Peerless Lake may refer to:

Peerless Lake (Alberta), a lake within the Municipal District of Opportunity No. 17 in Alberta, Canada
Peerless Lake, Alberta, an unincorporated community within the Municipal District of Opportunity No. 17 in Alberta, Canada